Koshbulak may refer to:

 Koshbulak, Sulukta - an urban-type settlement in Batken Region of Kyrgyzstan
 Kosh-Bulak, Jalal-Abad - a village in Jalal-Abad Region of Kyrgyzstan.